Ernie Drew "Black Jack" Barrett (born August 27, 1929) is a retired American basketball player. He played collegiately for the Kansas State University.

College and professional career 
Barrett was recruited by coaches including, Phog Allen and Henry Iba, but he chose Kansas State to play for Jack Gardner and Tex Winter in 1947.

He led the Kansas State Wildcats to the national championship game in 1951.  He suffered a shoulder injury in the semi-finals against Oklahoma A&M, and his injury heavily impacted the Wildcats, who lost in the title game.

Barrett was selected by the Boston Celtics in the 1st round (7th pick overall) of the 1951 NBA Draft and played for the Celtics (1953–54, 1955–56) in the National Basketball Association for 131 games.

Personal life 
A local restaurant, is named Mr. K’s in Barrett's honor. He helped raise money for many athletic facilities that are still in use. He has a statue, which depicts him extending his right arm for a handshake.

References

External links

1929 births
Living people
All-American college men's basketball players
American men's basketball players
Basketball players from Kansas
Boston Celtics draft picks
Boston Celtics players
Kansas State Wildcats athletic directors
Kansas State Wildcats men's basketball players
People from Pratt, Kansas
Shooting guards
Small forwards